Amantes del Desierto (Desert Lovers), is a Spanish-language telenovela produced by the United States-based television network Telemundo, RTI Colombia and Caracol Television. This limited-run series ran for 121 episodes from March 19, 2001, to September 4, 2001.

Plot
A man and a woman who love each other have to confront the world, in order to defend their feelings. Andrés Bustamante has been sentenced to twelve years in the gloomy cliff jail. Colonel Miguel Santana's daughter Barbara helps him escape from jail and takes him to the arid desert to hide. They are chased by Miguel Santana who makes them go through many dangerous adventures in search for freedom.

Desert Lovers is a passionate and adventurous love story that takes place between the 1950s and 1960s. It is starred by Andrés Bustamante, a young, modest doctor, and Bárbara Santana, a woman  who was born in a time when very conservative ideas ruled society.

Cast

Main cast

International Broadcasting

External links

Telemundo telenovelas
RTI Producciones telenovelas
Caracol Televisión telenovelas
2001 telenovelas
Colombian telenovelas
2001 American television series debuts
2001 American television series endings
2001 Colombian television series debuts
2001 Colombian television series endings
Spanish-language telenovelas